Fibulosebacea is a genus of fungi in the family Auriculariaceae. The genus is monotypic, containing the single species Fibulosebacea strigosa, found in Europe.

References

External links

Auriculariales
Fungi of Europe
Monotypic Basidiomycota genera